In Christ Alone: Modern Hymns Of Worship is a 2008 Christian worship album by Bethany Dillon and Matt Hammitt, lead singer of Sanctus Real released on Sparrow Records label.

Track list

References

2008 albums
Bethany Dillon albums
Sparrow Records albums